Leonhard Sohncke (22 February 1842  Halle – 1 November 1897 in Munich) was a German mathematician who classified the 65 space groups in which chiral crystal structures form, called Sohncke groups. He was a professor of physics at the Technische Hochschule Karlsruhe (now called the Karlsruhe Institute of Technology) from 1871 to 1883, at Jena from 1883 to 1886, and at the Technical University of Munich from 1886 to 1897.

His father Ludwig Adolph Sohncke (1807-1853) was professor of mathematics at the University of Halle. He published several books, including Geschichte der geometrie, hauptsachlich mit bezug auf die neueren methoden in 1839, a translation of Aperçu historique sur l’origine et la dévelopement des méthodes en géométrie (1837) by Michel Chasles.

References
 Paul Seidel, Leben und Werke von Leonhard Sohncke (1842–1897), einem Mitbegründer des Oberrheinischen Geologischen Vereins, Jber. Mitt. oberrhein. geol. Ver., N. F., 91, 101–112, 2009.
 Fritz Erk, Leonhard Sohncke, Meteorologische Zeitschrift volume 15 (1898), pp. 81–84.
 Sebastian Finsterwalder, Hermann Ebert: Leonhard Sohncke, Jahresbericht der Königlich Technischen Hochschule in München 1897/98, Anhang pp. 1–21.
 
 

1842 births
1897 deaths
19th-century German mathematicians
Academic staff of the Technical University of Munich